Calvary Baptist Schools is a Pre-Kindergarten through grade 12 private Baptist school in La Verne, California, in the Los Angeles metropolitan area. It serves levels preschool through senior high school. It was established in 1953.

References

External links
 Calvary Baptist Schools

High schools in Los Angeles County, California
Schools in Los Angeles County, California
Private high schools in California
Private middle schools in California
Private elementary schools in California
Educational institutions established in 1953
1953 establishments in California